The Acadian House is a historic house on Union Street in Guilford, Connecticut.  Built about 1670, it is one of Connecticut's oldest surviving houses, notable for its occupation by refugee Acadians following their 1755 deportation from Nova Scotia.  The house was listed on the National Register of Historic Places in 1975.

Description and history
The Acadian House is located in a residential setting just northeast of the town center of Guilford, on the south side of Union Street near its junction with Market Place.  It is a -story timber-framed structure, with a gabled roof, large central chimney, and clapboarded exterior.  Its main facade, oriented at an angle to the street, is three bays wide, with a central entrance framed with simple moulding and topped by a fourlight transom window.  The windows on either side of the entrance are placed asymmetrically.  The rear slope of the roof extends to the first floor, giving the house a saltbox shape.  The chimney has an unusual T shape, the result of an expansion after the house was built.

The oldest portion of the house was built about 1670 by Joseph Clay.  Clay's grandson inherited the property in the 18th century, but vacated the house for a more modern one in 1726. The house has its name because a family of Acadians from Grand Pré were settled in the house following their 1755 deportation from Nova Scotia.

See also

 List of the oldest buildings in Connecticut
 History of the Acadians
 National Register of Historic Places listings in New Haven County, Connecticut

References

Houses in Guilford, Connecticut
Houses on the National Register of Historic Places in Connecticut
Houses completed in 1670
Saltbox architecture in Connecticut
National Register of Historic Places in New Haven County, Connecticut
1670 establishments in Connecticut